San Marino first appeared in the quadrennial Mediterranean Games in 1987, and has regularly continued to send athletes to the multi-sport event ever since.

Overview

By event

See also
San Marino at the Olympics
San Marino the Paralympics

External links
Medals table per country and per Games at the official International Committee of Mediterranean Games (CIJM) website